Hemicytheridae is a family of ostracods belonging to the order Podocopida.

Genera

Genera:
 Ambolus Ikeya, Jellinek & Tsukagoshi, 1998
 Ambostracon Hazel, 1962
 Anterocythere McKenzie & Swain, 1967

References

Ostracods